The Vanity Girl is a 1920 novel by the British writer Compton Mackenzie.

References

Bibliography
 David Joseph Dooley. Compton Mackenzie. Twayne Publishers, 1974.

1920 British novels
Novels by Compton Mackenzie